A safari is an overland journey to observe wild animals, especially in Southeast Africa. The so-called "Big Five" game animals of Africa – lion, leopard, rhinoceros, elephant, and Cape buffalo – particularly form an important part of the safari market, both for wildlife viewing and big-game hunting.

Etymology 
These words are used for any type of journey, e.g. by bus from Nairobi to Mombasa or by ferry from Dar es Salaam to Unguja. Safari entered the English language at the end of the 1850s thanks to explorer Richard Francis Burton.

The Regimental March of the King's African Rifles was "Funga Safari", literally 'set out on a journey', or, in other words, pack up equipment ready for travel.

Which is, in English:

On Kenya's independence from the United Kingdom, "Funga Safari" was retained as the Regimental March of the Kenya Rifles, the successor to the KAR.

History
In 1836, William Cornwallis Harris led an expedition purely to observe and record wildlife and landscapes. Harris established the safari style of journey, starting with a not too strenuous rising at first light, an energetic day walking, an afternoon rest then concluding with a formal dinner and telling stories in the evening over drinks and tobacco. The hunting aspect traditionally associated with the safari is said to have its origins in the early 17th century in the region of Évora, Alentejo, where villagers got together to hunt wild boar and reclaim land for farming.

The firm of Newland & Tarlton Ltd (founded 1904) were the pioneers of luxury tented safaris.

Literary genre
Jules Verne's first novel Five Weeks in a Balloon published in 1863 and H. Rider Haggard's first novel King Solomon's Mines published in 1885, both describe journeys of English travellers on Safari and were best sellers in their day. These two books gave rise to a genre of Safari adventure novels and films.

Ernest Hemingway wrote several fiction and non-fiction pieces about African safaris. His short stories "The Short Happy Life of Francis Macomber" and "The Snows of Kilimanjaro" are set on African safaris and were written after Hemingway's own experience on safari. His books Green Hills of Africa and True at First Light are both set on African safaris.

Cinematic genre
The safari provided countless hours of cinema entertainment in sound films from Trader Horn (1931) onwards. The safari was used in many adventure films such as the Tarzan, Jungle Jim, and Bomba the Jungle Boy film series up to The Naked Prey (1965) where Cornel Wilde, a white hunter, becomes game himself. The safari genre films were parodied in the Bob Hope comedies Road to Zanzibar and Call Me Bwana. A short 15-minute helicopter safari was shown in Africa Addio where clients are armed, flown from their hotel and landed in front of an unlucky and baffled elephant. Out of Africa has Karen Blixen and famous hunter Denys Finch Hatton travelling, with Denys refusing to abandon home comforts using fine china and crystal, and listening to Mozart recordings over the gramophone while on safari trip.

Fashion

The safari-style originated from British officers and the jackets worn during their campaigns in Africa. There is a certain theme or style associated with the word, which includes khaki clothing, belted bush jackets, pith helmets or slouch hats, and animal skin patterns. Pith helmet was initially worn by the British military in the tropics and was adopted as streetwear between 1870 and 1950. Condé Nast describes safari jackets as, "crisp drill cotton with pockets, buttons, epaulets, belt," and a part of Kenyan colonial style.

For Theodore Roosevelt's 1909–1910 safari trip, he was "outfitted" in safari-style by his friend Lord Cranworth during his post-presidential trip. Lord Cranworth's firm Newland & Tarlton, is a luxury safari outfitter, creating safari-style clothing. Additionally, other sources state Roosevelt was outfitted by Willis & Geiger in 1908. Hemingway, like Roosevelt on safari, chose to use British style rifles produced by Holland & Holland or Westley Richards. Within Hollywood, celebrities like Grace Kelly and Johnny Weissmuller wore safari jackets. Ernest Hemingway wore safari-style jackets, communicating a form of adventure also echoed in Hollywood. According to Conde Nast, the Safari jacket is still a part of contemporary fashion.

In the 2005 spring/summer edition of British Vogue an article titled,"World Vision: the grown-up approach to global style,” featured ‘‘haute safari’’ style clothing. Contemporary American public figures such as Melania Trump have worn safari fashion. Mrs. Trump wore a safari-style dress and jackets during her 2018 trip to Africa. On this trip Mrs. Trump went on a safari in Kenya, she wore a pith helmet. Some have criticized the choice as evoking colonial ideals. In 2014 Harper's Bazaar announced trend alerts featuring animal prints and “safari sleek" style. Couture designers in their 2015 fashion shows featured variations of safari-style in their collections. Designer Yang Lei featured a silk safari-style evening gown in his Spring/Summer collection during Paris fashion week. Alexander Wang's collection focused on a variety of white shirts, including a safari-style white shirt dress. The New York Times described designer Alberta Ferretti's 2015 daywear collection as "safari-sleek."

In John Molloy's history of the leisure suit, he details that safari-style originated from British Officers wearing their uniforms outside military uses as "a status symbol, but only in casual settings." Molloy stated in 1975 that it continues to be a form of casual menswear. Alternatively, in Malindi Kenya, professional wear in the 1990s included safari-style clothing. Yves Saint Laurent's 1967 Africa collection featured the "Saharienne" safari jacket. In later collections, Yves Saint Laurent produced an iconic safari top. According to Harper's Bazaar, the collection was "a fantasy of primitive genius." On the other hand, differing fashion historians believe He had the gift of borrowing from one culture without being condescending to the other.

The term safari chic arose after the release of the film Out of Africa. It included not only clothing but also interior design and architecture. Safari-style interiors feature African decor, various hues of brown, natural materials, animal print furniture, rugs and wallpaper. In 2005 Architectural Digest released a list of luxurious safari camps. Newland, Tarlton & Co. Furniture Collection, creates luxury safari-style furniture in featured safari camps, hotels and private homes. Safari fashion also extends to fragrance collections by American designer Ralph Lauren; The Safari fragrance created in 1990 was advertised as "a floral aroma with a light breeze scented by grasses, freedom, and the romance of vast open spaces."

See also
 Safari park
 Ecotourism in Africa
 Overlanding

References

External links

African culture
Hunting
Swahili words and phrases
Types of tourism
Tourism in Africa
Adventure travel
Types of travel

sw:Safari